Sandra Kennedy, is an American politician who served on the Arizona Corporation Commission from 2019 to 2023. Kennedy was first elected to the commission in 2008 but was defeated for re-election in 2012. She ran again for the commission in 2014, but was defeated in the general election. In the 2018 elections she was elected back to the commission. Kennedy served as a member of the state senate from 1992 to 1998 and in the Arizona House of Representatives from 1986 to 1992.

References

External links
Ballotpedia

|-

1957 births
2020 United States presidential electors
20th-century American women politicians
21st-century American women politicians
Arizona State University alumni
Democratic Party Arizona state senators
Democratic Party members of the Arizona House of Representatives
Living people
Politicians from Oklahoma City
Women state legislators in Arizona